Daskalakis is a Greek surname. Notable people with the surname include:
 Cleon Daskalakis (born 1962), retired professional hockey player
 Demetris Daskalakis (born 1977), Greek football defender
 Constantinos Daskalakis (born 1981), Greek theoretical computer scientist
 Georgios Daskalakis (1936–2022), Greek politician
 Iosif Daskalakis (born 1982), Greek footballer

See also
 Gianna Angelopoulos-Daskalaki, Greek businesswoman
 Daskalakis Athletic Center, arena in Philadelphia, Pennsylvania

Greek-language surnames
Surnames